Marlon Davidson (born May 11, 1998) is an American football defensive end who is currently a free agent. He was drafted in 2020 by the Atlanta Falcons of the National Football League (NFL). He played college football at Auburn.

High school career
As a five-star prospect, Davidson was highly recruited out of high school. Davidson chose to sign with Auburn, where his brother, Kenneth Carter, played football and is now on staff for the Tigers.

College career
Davidson made an instant impact on the Tigers, starting in all 13 games and becoming the first Auburn freshman to start on the defensive line since 1985.  He was also able to make the All-SEC freshman team.  During his sophomore year, Davidson was able to become the SEC defensive player of the week after a game with Missouri.

Professional career

Davidson was selected by the Atlanta Falcons in the second round with the 47th overall pick in the 2020 NFL Draft. He was placed on the reserve/COVID-19 list on October 13, 2020, and was activated on October 26.

On December 5, 2021 he had his first career interception, a pick-six against Tom Brady.

On September 1, 2022, Davidson was placed on injured reserve after undergoing arthroscopic knee surgery. He was released on October 25.

References

External links
Atlanta Falcons bio
Auburn Tigers bio

1998 births
Living people
People from Greenville, Alabama
Players of American football from Alabama
American football defensive ends
American football defensive tackles
Auburn Tigers football players
Atlanta Falcons players